Proto-Indo-European verbs reflect a complex system of morphology, more complicated than the substantive, with verbs categorized according to their aspect, using multiple grammatical moods and voices, and being conjugated according to person, number and tense. In addition to finite forms thus formed, non-finite forms such as participles are also extensively used.

The verbal system is clearly represented in Ancient Greek and Vedic Sanskrit, which closely correspond, in nearly all aspects of their verbal systems, and are two of the most well-understood of the early daughter languages of Proto-Indo-European.

Basics

Verb conjugation in Proto-Indo-European involves the interplay of six dimensions (number, person, voice, mood, aspect and tense) with the following variables identified under the Cowgill-Rix system, which is one of the methodologies proposed

and applies only to certain subfamilies: 

Further, participles can be considered part of the verbal systems although they are not verbs themselves, and as with other PIE nouns, they can be declined across seven or eight cases, for three genders and three numbers.

Building blocks

Roots

The starting point for the morphological analysis of the PIE verb is the root. PIE roots are morphemes with lexical meanings, which usually consist of a single vowel flanked by one or more consonants arranged to very specific rules.

Stems and stem formation

Before the final endings — to denote number, person, etc., can be applied, additional elements may be added to the root. The resulting component here after any such affixion is the stem, to which the final endings can then be added to obtain the conjugated forms.

Athematic and thematic stems

Verbs, like nominals, made a basic distinction based on whether a short, ablauting vowel -e- or -o-, called the thematic vowel was affixed to the root before the final endings added.

In the case of the thematic conjugations, some of the endings differed depending on whether this vowel was present or absent, but by and large the endings were the same for both types.

The athematic system is much older and exhibits ablaut within the paradigm. In the descendant languages, athematic verbs were often extended with a thematic vowel, likely because of the complications resulting from the consonant clusters formed when the mostly consonant-initial endings were added directly onto the mostly consonant-final stems.

Consequently, the athematic verbs became a non-productive relic class in the later Indo-European languages. In groups such as Germanic and Italic, the athematic verbs had almost gone entirely extinct by the time of written records, while Sanskrit and Ancient Greek preserve them more clearly.

Proposed endings

At least the following sets of endings existed:
 Primary ("present") endings used for:
 Present tense of the indicative mood of imperfective verbs.
 Subjunctive mood
 Secondary ("past" or "tenseless") endings used for:
 Past tense of the indicative mood of imperfective verbs.
 Indicative mood of perfective verbs.
 Optative mood
 Stative endings used for
 Indicative mood of stative verbs.
 Imperative endings used for
 Imperative mood of all verbs.

Note that, from a diachronic perspective, the secondary endings were actually the more basic ones, while the primary endings were formed from them by adding a suffix, originally -i in the active voice and -r in the middle voice.

The more central subfamilies of Indo-European have innovated by replacing the middle-voice -r with the -i of the active voice.

Traditional accounts say that the first-person singular primary ending is the only form where athematic verbs used a different ending from thematic verbs.

Sihler, however, notes that many of the most archaic languages have third-person singular forms missing a t and proposes an alternative t-less thematic ending along with the standard ending. Greek and Balto-Slavic have t-less forms in thematic actives, whereas Vedic and Hittite have t-less athematic middle forms.

 uses the t-less forms as the starting point for a radical rethinking of the thematic endings, based primarily on Greek and Lithuanian.  These proposals are still controversial, however.

Active eventive endings

Middle eventive endings

Stative endings

A second conjugation has been proposed in Jay Jasanoff's h₂e-conjugation theory. Svensson (2001) suggests *-h₂éy for the second and third dual stative endings, on the basis of evidence from Indo-Iranian, Tocharian, and Gaulish.

Verb aspects

Proto-Indo-European verbs belonged to one of three aspect classes:
 Stative verbs depicted a state of being.
 Eventive verbs expressed events. These could be further divided between:
 Perfective verbs depicting actions viewed as punctual, an entire process without attention to internal details, completed as a whole or not completed at all. No distinction in tense was made.
 Imperfective verbs depicting durative, ongoing or repeated action, with attention to internal details. This included the time of speaking; separate endings were used for present or future events in contrast to past events.

The terminology around the stative, perfective and imperfective aspects can be confusing. The use of these terms here is based on the reconstructed meanings of the corresponding forms in PIE and the terms used broadly in linguistics to refer to aspects with these meanings.

In traditional PIE terminology, the forms described here as stative, perfective and imperfective are known as the perfect, aorist and present systems:

 Stative = Perfect
 Perfective = Aorist
 Imperfective = Present

The present/imperfective system in turn can be conjugated in two tenses, described here as present and past but traditionally known as present and imperfect.  The traditional terms are based on the names of the corresponding forms in Ancient Greek (also applied to Sanskrit), and are still commonly encountered.  Furthermore, there is a separate secondary-verb form commonly known as the "stative" and marked by a suffix *-eh₁-, which has no connection with the stative/perfect described here.

The following table shows the two systems of terminology.

In Proto-Indo-European, the aspects had no tense meaning, like they did in the later languages. In Ancient Greek, for example, the perfect carried the meaning of a state resulting from a past action, but the PIE stative referred to the state alone. Likewise, the aorist, though having a tense-like meaning in Ancient Greek, had none in PIE. Perfective and stative verbs were effectively tenseless, or indifferent to time.

Eventive verbs

The perfective ("aorist") and imperfective ("present") aspect classes are together known as eventive, or verbs that depict events, to distinguish them from stative (verbs that depict a state of being). Both shared the same conjugation, with some small differences. The main difference was that imperfective verbs allowed the use of special present-tense (primary) endings, while perfective verbs only allowed the default tenseless (secondary) endings.

The present tense used the primary eventive endings, and was used specifically to refer to present events, although it could also refer to future events. The past tense referred to past events, and used the secondary eventive endings. Perfective verbs always used the secondary endings, but did not necessarily have a past-tense meaning. The secondary endings were, strictly speaking, tenseless, even in imperfective verbs. This meant that past endings could also be used with a present meaning, if it was obvious from context in some way. This use still occurred in Vedic Sanskrit, where in a sequence of verbs only the first might be marked for present tense (with primary endings), while the remainder was unmarked (secondary endings). If the verbs were subjunctive or optative, the mood markings might likewise be only present on the first verb, with the others not marked for mood (i.e. indicative).

In Ancient Greek, Armenian and Indo-Iranian, the secondary endings came to be accompanied by a prefixing particle known as the augment, reconstructed as *e- or *h₁e-. The function of the augment is unclear (it is usually thought to be connected to the meaning of 'past'), but it was not a fixed part of the inflection as it was in the later languages. In Homeric Greek and Vedic Sanskrit, many imperfect (past imperfective) and aorist verbs are still found lacking the augment; its use became mandatory only in later Greek and Sanskrit.

Morphologically, the indicative of perfective verbs was indistinguishable from the past indicative of imperfective verbs, and it is likely that in early stages of PIE, these were the same verb formation. At some point in the history of PIE, the present tense was created by developing the primary endings out of the secondary endings. Not all verbs came to be embellished with these new endings; for semantic reasons, some verbs never had a present tense. These verbs were the perfective verbs, while the ones that did receive a present tense were imperfective.

Stative verbs

Stative verbs signified a current state of being rather than events. It was traditionally known as perfect, a name which was assigned based upon the Latin tense before the stative nature of the Proto-Indo-European (PIE) form was fully known. While Latin conflated the static aspect concept with tense, in PIE there was no association with any particular tense.

The stative aspect was marked formally with its own personal endings, which differed from the eventives by a root in the singular in o-grade, but elsewhere in zero-grade, and typically by reduplication.

Like the perfective verbs, stative verbs were tenseless, and described a state without reference to time. This did not mean that stative verbs referred to permanent states (as in Spanish ser versus temporary estar), but rather that there was no way to express, within the verbal morphology, whether the state was applicable in the present moment, in the past, or in the future. These nuances were, presumably, expressed using adverbs.

In many daughter languages, the stative took on a meaning that implied a previous action that had caused the current state, a meaning which resulted in the Greek perfect.  Eventually, by shifting emphasis to the inchoative action, an action that was just started or a state that was just begun prior to the resulting state, the stative generally developed into a past tense (as in Germanic, Latin, and later, Greek). The original present sense of the IE stative is seen in the Germanic preterite-present verbs such as Gothic wait "I know" (< PIE *, originally "I am in a state resulting from having seen/found"; cf. Latin vidēre "to see", Sanskrit vinátti "he finds"), with exact cognates in Sanskrit véda, Ancient Greek oĩda, and Old Church Slavonic vědě, all of which retain their essentially present tense meaning "I know".

Other verbal categories

Voice
Verbs originally had two voices: active and mediopassive.  In some daughter languages (e.g., Sanskrit) this was supplemented with a passive voice; in others (e.g., Latin) the mediopassive evolved to have a passive meaning for roots that were also used in the active voice, but retained its mediopassive character for so-called deponent roots.

Mood
The moods of PIE included indicative, imperative, subjunctive, optative and perhaps injunctive.

Indicative
The indicative mood was the default mood, and, alongside the imperative, the oldest. It was used for simple statements of fact. 
Imperfective verbs. The indicative mood was the only mood to have distinctions in tense in imperfective verbs, all other moods were tenseless.
The present tense used the primary endings. 
The past tense used the secondary endings. 
Perfective verbs
The indicative of perfective verbs used secondary endings.
Stative verbs
They used their own, entirely different set of endings in the indicative mood.

Imperative
The imperative mood was used for commands directed towards other people, and therefore only occurred in the second and third person. It used its own set of special imperative endings.

Subjunctive
The subjunctive mood was used to describe completely hypothetical events, along the lines of "suppose that I oversleep...". It was also sometimes used for future events (which are by definition hypothetical rather than actual) for this reason.

The subjunctive was formed by adding the thematic vowel to the stem, along with primary endings, with the stem in the e-grade. The subjunctive of athematic verbs was thus thematic, and morphologically indistinguishable from a thematic indicative. For verbs that were already thematic, a second thematic vowel was added after the first, creating a long thematic vowel.

Optative
The optative mood was used for wishes or hopes, like the English "may I sleep well". It was formed with an athematic ablauting suffix -yéh₁- ~ -ih₁- attached to the zero-grade of the stem.

In Vedic Sanskrit, optatives were very rarely found for characterised stems (primary and secondary derivations); most occurrences of the optative are in root verbs. This is taken by Sihler to indicate that the optative was not really a mood in PIE, but a separate verb, and was thus restricted to being derived directly from roots only, not from already-derived verbs. In addition, it appears that in PIE itself, stative verbs did not have the optative mood; it was limited to eventive verbs. Early Indo-Iranian texts mostly lack attestations of stative optative forms.

Injunctive
The place of the injunctive mood, of obscure function, is debated. It takes the form of the bare root in e-grade with secondary endings, without the prefixed augment that was common to forms with secondary endings in these languages. The injunctive was thus entirely without tense marking. This causes Fortson (among others) to suggest that the use of the injunctive was for gnomic expressions (as in Homer) or in otherwise timeless statements (as in Vedic).

Verb formation

From any particular root, verbs could be derived in a variety of means.

In the most conservative Indo-European languages (e.g. Ancient Greek, Sanskrit, Tocharian, Old Irish), there is a separate set of conjugational classes for each of the tense/aspect categories, with no general relationship obtaining between the class of a given verb in one category relative to another. The oldest stages of these languages (especially Vedic Sanskrit) reveal clear remains of an even less organized system, where a given verb root might have multiple ways, or no way at all, of being conjugated in a given tense/aspect category — sometimes with meanings that differ in unpredictable ways.

This clearly suggests that the tense/aspect categories originated as separate lexical verbs, part of a system of derivational morphology (compare the related verbs "to rise" and "to raise", or the abstract nouns "produce", "product", "production" derived from the verb "to produce"), and only gradually became integrated into a coherent system of inflectional morphology, which was still incomplete at the time of the proto-language.

There were a variety of means by which new verbs could be derived from existing verbal roots, as well as from fully formed nominals. Most of these involved adding a suffix to the root (or stem), but there were a few more peculiar formations. One formation that was relatively productive for forming imperfective verbs, but especially stative verbs, was reduplication, in which the initial consonants of the root were duplicated. Another notable way of forming imperfective verbs was the nasal infix, which was inserted within the root itself rather than affixed to it.

Root verbs

The most basic verb formation was derived directly from the root, with no suffix, and expressed the meaning of the root itself. Such "root verbs" could be either athematic or thematic; it was not predictable which type was used. The aspect of a root verb was determined by the root itself, which had its own "root aspect" inherent in the basic meaning of the root. Thus, there were verbal roots whose default meaning was durative, ongoing, or iterative, and verbs derived from them were generally imperfective in aspect. Roots whose meaning was punctiliar or discrete created perfective-aspect verbs. Stative roots were rare; perhaps the only reconstructible stative root verb was  "know".

There are numerous unexplained surprises in this system, however. The common root  meant "to be", which is an archetypically stative notion. Yet, aspect-wise, it was an imperfective root, and thus formed an imperfective root verb , rather than a stative verb.

Primary derivations

In early PIE, the aspect system was less well-developed, and root verbs were simply used in their root aspects, with various derivational formations available for expressing more specific nuances. By late PIE, however, as the aspect system evolved, the need had arisen for verbs of a different aspect than that of the root. Several of the formations, which originally formed distinct verbs, gradually came to be used as "aspect switching" derivations, whose primary purpose was to create a verb of one aspect from a root of another aspect.

This led to a fundamental distinction in PIE verb formations, between primary and secondary formations. Primary formations included the root verbs and the derivational formations that came to be used as aspect switching devices, while secondary formations remained strictly derivational and retained significant semantic value. For example, the secondary suffix  derived causative verbs, and retained this purpose and meaning throughout the descendants of PIE. The common primary suffix , however, came to be used for the majority of verb formations in Latin, without any discernible meaning being conveyed by the suffix; its function had become purely morphological.

A verb needed no derivational or aspect-switching markers for its own root aspect. Affixes of various types were used to switch the inherent aspect to a different type. Such affixes created "characterised" verb formations, contrasting with the basic "root" or "uncharacterised" formation. Examples of aspect switching affixes include -yé-, -sḱé-, and the nasal infix, all of which were used to derive imperfective verbs from roots whose inherent aspect was not already imperfective. Conversely, the "s-aorist" formation (retained most notably in Greek) used the suffix -s- to create perfective verbs. Many roots were "hyper-characterized", however, with an aspect marker added to a root that already had the correct aspect. This may have been done in order to emphasize the aspect. For example, the s-aorist also seemed to have been used when the verb root was inherently perfective already.

A root did not necessarily have verbs to express all three aspects. There were many roots that seem to have had verbs for only for one or two aspects in PIE. For example, the root  "to be" seems to have formed only an imperfective verb, no perfective or stative verbs derived from this root can be reconstructed. Various later languages amended this situation differently as needed, often by using entirely different roots (suppletion).

While several aspect switchers were available to be added to the root, particular markers were not exclusively assigned to any root. Certain roots did show a preference for the same markers in multiple daughter languages, but the use of a particular marker was not exclusive, and a variety of formations are often found for the same root. For example, the basic root for "stand", *steh₂-, was a perfective root. Therefore, the root verb had the punctual sense of "come to a standing position; to rise from a sitting position". In order to speak about "standing" in a present, durative sense ("be in a standing position"), the root verb required a derivational marker to put it into the imperfective aspect. For this root, the imperfective aspect switcher was often reduplication (Ancient Greek hístēmi, Sankskrit tíṣṭhati), but the Germanic languages also show a nasal infix or suffix for this root (Gothic present ik standa vs. preterite ik stōþ), at least by a later period. The Slavic languages, meanwhile, also have a form derived with the -yé- suffix. Such discrepancies suggest that in PIE proper, this root had no imperfective verb at all, and the aspect-switched verbs we see in the later descendants were formed independently of each other.

Many primary formations retained some "residue" of their original derivational function and meaning, and significant relics of this earlier derivational system can be reconstructed for PIE. Both formations survived side by side in Greek, suggesting that they did not overlap significantly enough in meaning throughout their history for one or the other to fall out of use.

Secondary derivations

Secondary verbs were formed either from primary verb roots (so-called deverbal verbs) or from nouns (denominal verbs or denominative verbs) or adjectives (deadjectival verbs). (In practice, the term denominative verb is often used to incorporate formations based on both nouns and adjectives because PIE nouns and adjectives had the same suffixes and endings, and the same processes were used to form verbs from both nouns and adjectives.) Deverbal formations included causative ("I had someone do something"), iterative/inceptive ("I did something repeatedly"/"I began to do something"), desiderative ("I want to do something").

The formation of secondary verbs remained part of the derivational system and did not necessarily have completely predictable meanings (compare the remnants of causative constructions in English — to fall vs. to fell, to sit vs. to set, to rise vs. to raise and to rear).

They are distinguished from the primary formations by the fact that they generally are part of the derivational rather than inflectional morphology system in the daughter languages. However, as mentioned above, this distinction was only beginning to develop in PIE. Not surprisingly, some of these formations have become part of the inflectional system in particular daughter languages. Probably the most common example is the future tense, which exists in many daughter languages but in forms that are not cognate, and tend to reflect either the PIE subjunctive or a PIE desiderative formation.

Secondary verbs were always imperfective, and had no corresponding perfective or stative verbs, nor was it possible (at least within PIE) to derive such verbs from them. This was a basic constraint in the verbal system that prohibited applying a derived form to an already-derived form. Evidence from the Rig Veda (the earliest attestation of Sanskrit) indicates that secondary verbs in PIE were not conjugated in the subjunctive or optative moods. This suggests that these moods follow the same constraint, and are derivational in origin. The later Indo-European languages worked around these limitations, but each in their own way.

Formation types
The following gives a list of the most common verb types reconstructed for (late) PIE.

Primary imperfective

Root athematic

Also called "simple athematic", this formation derived imperfective verbs directly from a root. It can be divided into two subtypes:
 Normal type: *(é)-ti ~ *(∅)-énti. Alternating between accented e-grade root, and zero-grade root with accent on the endings.
 Narten type: *(ḗ/é)-ti ~ *(é)-nti. Mostly root accent and alternating lengthened/normal grade, or, according to an alternative view, fixed normal grade throughout.

The normal type is the most common by far.

Examples: *h₁ésti.

Root thematic

Also called "simple thematic", it functioned the same as the root athematic verbs. There were also two types:
 normal type: *(é)-eti ~ *(é)-onti. Accented e-grade root.
 "tudati" type: *(∅)-éti ~ *(∅)-ónti. Zero-grade root, accent on theme vowel.

The "tudati" type is named after the Sanskrit verb that typifies this formation. It is much rarer than the normal type.

Examples: *bʰéreti.

Reduplicated athematic

The root is prefixed with a copy of the initial consonant(s) of the root, separated by a vowel. The accent is fixed on this prefix, but the root grade alternates as in root athematic verbs. The vowel can be either e or i:
 e-reduplication: *(é)-(e)-ti ~ *(é)-(∅)-nti
 i-reduplication: *(í)-(e)-ti ~ *(í)-(∅)-nti

Examples: *dʰédʰeh₁ti, *stísteh₂ti.

Reduplicated thematic

*(í)-(∅)-eti ~ *(í)-(∅)-onti. Like the athematic equivalent, but the vowel is always i and the root is always in zero-grade (like in the "tudati" type).

Examples: *sísdeti.

Nasal infix

*(né)-ti ~ *(n)-énti. This peculiar formation consists of an infix -né- ~ -n- that is inserted before final consonant of the zero-grade root, and inflected with athematic inflection. The infix itself ablauts like root athematic verbs. This formation is limited to roots ending in a stop or laryngeal, and containing a non-initial sonorant. This sonorant is always syllabified in the zero-grade, the infix is never syllabic.

Examples: *linékʷti, *tl̥néh₂ti.

nu-suffix
*(∅)-néw-ti ~ *(∅)-nu-énti. Formed with an ablauting athematic suffix *-néw- ~ *-nu- attached to the root. These are sometimes considered to be a special case of the nasal-infix type.

Examples: *tn̥néwti.

ye-suffix

This thematic formation exists in two types:

 *(é)-y-eti ~ *(é)-y-onti. Accented root in e-grade. This type was primarily used to form transitive imperfective verbs from intransitive perfective verbs.
 *(∅)-y-éti ~ *(∅)-y-ónti. Zero-grade root with accent on the thematic vowel. This type formed mostly intransitive imperfective verbs, often deponent (occurring only in middle voice).

Examples: *wr̥ǵyéti, *gʷʰédʰyeti, *spéḱyeti.

sḱe-suffix

*(∅)-sḱ-éti ~ *(∅)-sḱ-ónti. Thematic, with zero-grade root and accent on the thematic vowel. This type formed durative, iterative or perhaps inchoative verbs.

Examples: *gʷm̥sḱéti, *pr̥sḱéti.

se-suffix

*(é)-s-eti ~ *(é)-s-onti. Thematic, with accented e-grade root.

Examples: *h₂lékseti.

Secondary imperfective

eh₁-stative
*(∅)-éh₁-ti ~ *(∅)-éh₁-n̥ti. This formed secondary stative verbs from adjectival roots, perhaps also from adjective stems. The verbs thus created were, nonetheless, imperfective verbs. This suffix was thematicised in most descendants with a -ye- extension, thus -éh₁ye- as attested in most daughter languages. It is unclear if the verb ablauted; most indications are that it did not, but there are some hints that the zero-grade did occur in a few places (Latin past participle, Germanic class 3 weak verbs). Some scholars, including the editors of the Lexikon der indogermanischen Verben, believe that the eh₁-stem was originally an aorist stem with 'fientive' meaning ('to become X'), whereas the -ye- extension created the present with 'essive' meaning, 'to be x'.

Examples: *h₁rudʰéh₁ti.

éye-causative/iterative
*(o)-éy-eti ~ *(o)-éy-onti. Thematic, affixed to the o-grade of the root, with accent on the suffix. This formed causative verbs, meaning "to cause to do", or iterative verbs, meaning "to do repeatedly". Most branches, like Germanic, preserve the causative meaning, but some (Greek and Slavic) retain mostly the iterative one.

Examples: *sodéyeti, *bʰoréyeti, *h₃roǵéyeti.

(h₁)se-desiderative
This thematic suffix formed desiderative verbs, meaning "to want to do". Two formations are attested:
 *(é)-(h₁)s-eti ~ *(é)-(h₁)s-onti. Accented full grade of the root.
 *(í)-(∅)-(h₁)s-eti ~ *(í)-(∅)-(h₁)s-onti. Reduplicated with i, accent on the reduplicated prefix, zero-grade root.

Examples: *wéydseti, *ḱíḱl̥h₁seti.

sye-desiderative
*(∅)-sy-éti ~ *(∅)-sy-ónti. Similar to above, but with an accented thematic vowel and zero-grade root.

Examples: *bʰuHsyéti.

ye-denominative
*-y-éti ~ *-y-ónti. Affixed to noun and adjective stems for a variety of meanings; accent is on the thematic vowel. The thematic vowel of the nominal stem, if any, is retained as e, as is any possible -eh₂ suffix, thus creating the variants -eyé- and -eh₂yé-, which developed into independent suffixes in many daughter languages.

h₂-factitive
*-h₂-ti ~ *-h₂-n̥ti. This formed factitive verbs from adjective stems. As above, the thematic vowel was retained, as e. Like the eh₁-stative, this suffix was often extended with -ye- in the daughter languages, giving -h₂ye-.

Examples: *néweh₂ti.

ye-factitive
*-y-éti ~ *-y-ónti. Very similar to the denominative, but formed from adjectives only. The thematic vowel is retained, but this time as o. The existence of this type in PIE is uncertain.

Perfective

Root athematic

*(é)-t ~ *(∅)-ént. The same as root athematic imperfective verbs. Most perfective verbs appear to have been of this type.

Examples: *gʷémt, *léykʷt, *bʰúHt.

Root thematic

*(∅)-ét ~ *(∅)-ónt. The same as root thematic imperfective verbs. This formation was very rare in PIE, barely any are reconstructable, but became more widespread in the later languages. The formation seemed to have zero-grade of the root and accent on the thematic vowel, like the "tudati" type.

Examples: *h₁ludʰét.

Reduplicated thematic

*(é)-(∅)-et ~ *(é)-(∅)-ont. This formation was maybe even rarer than the root thematic type, only one verb is reconstructable.

Examples: *wéwket.

s-suffix

*(ḗ)-s-t ~ *(é)-s-n̥t. Inflected as the "Narten" athematic type, with lengthened grade in the singular and fixed accent. This suffix was the primary means of deriving perfective verbs from imperfective roots, though it appears that there were not many verbs created that way. The suffix became very productive in many of the descendants.

Examples: *dḗyḱst, *wḗǵʰst.

Stative

Root

*(ó)-e ~ *(∅)-ḗr. Owing to the rarity of stative roots, this formation was correspondingly rare. Only one verb can be reconstructed.

Examples: *wóyde.

Reduplicated

*(e)-(ó)-e ~ *(e)-(∅)-ḗr. This was the only way to form new stative verbs.

Examples: *memóne, *lelóykʷe.

Examples

Ringe makes certain assumptions about synchronic PIE phonology that are not universally accepted:
Sievers' Law applies in all positions and to all resonants, including .
Word-final  becomes  when adjacent to a voiced segment (i.e. vowel or voiced consonant).

Two sets of endings are provided for the primary middle forms, as described above.

The above assumptions about PIE phonology apply, in addition to a rule that deletes laryngeals which occur in the sequence -oRHC or -oRH#, where R stands for any resonant, H any laryngeal, C any consonant and # the end of a word.

Post-PIE developments

The various verb formations came to be reorganised in the daughter languages. The tendency was for various forms to become integrated into a single "paradigm" which combined verbs of different aspects into a coherent whole. This process proceeded in steps:

 Combining different forms with similar meanings into a system of three major aspects. The result of this was the so-called "Cowgill–Rix" system described above, which was completed in late PIE, shortly after Tocharian had split off and well after the Anatolian split. At this stage, formations that originally had various purposes had their semantics largely harmonized into one of the aspect classes, with a clear distinction between primary and secondary derivations. These formations, however, were still separate lexical verbs, still sometimes with idiosyncratic meanings, and for a given aspect a root could still form multiple verbs or no verbs in that particular aspect. This is the stage visible in early Vedic Sanskrit.
 Combining the various aspects under a single unified verb, with a clear distinction between inflectional and derivational forms. This involved pruning multiple verbs formed from the same root with the same aspect, and creating new verbs for aspects that were missing for certain roots. At this stage a single verb was defined by a set of principal parts, each of which (approximately) defined the type of formation used in each of its aspects. This stage was in process in Vedic Sanskrit and was largely completed in Ancient Greek, although even in this language there are still verbs lacking some of the aspects, as well as occasional multiple formations for the same aspect, with distinct and idiosyncratic meanings. Many remnants of this stage are also found in Old Church Slavonic, which still had distinct stems for the present, aorist and infinitive/participle. Most Slavic languages later lost the aorist, but verbs still have distinct (and unpredictable) present and infinitive stems up to the present day.
 Regularizing the formations into "conjugations" that applied across the whole system, so that a verb belonged to a single conjugational class rather than one class for each aspect formation. This stage was partly complete in Latin, in particular in regards to the -āre, -ēre, -īre (first, second, fourth) conjugations. The older system, however, is still clearly visible in the -ere class, with each verb in this class, and some in the other classes, needing to be defined by separate present, perfect and supine formations.In Proto-Germanic, this process seemed to have been largely completed, with only a few relic formations such as j-presents and n-infix presents remaining as "irregular" verbs. However, a clear distinction was still maintained between primary and secondary verbs, since the lack of multiple aspect stems in the latter eventually led to the creation of the weak verbs, with most of the original primary verbs becoming strong verbs. A small minority of statives retained their perfect/stative inflection, becoming the preterite-present verbs.
 Gradual reduction in the number of conjugational classes, as well as the number of productive classes. This development is very clearly attested in the later Germanic languages. Afrikaans is an extreme example, where almost all verbs follow the same conjugational pattern. English is also a strong example, where all weak verb classes have merged, many older strong verbs have become weak, and all other verbs are considered irregular relic formations. Dutch and German also show this development, but the non-productive strong verb classes have remained more regular. Swedish still retains two weak verb classes, although only one is productive.In the Romance languages, these developments have also occurred, but to a lesser degree. The classes -āre -ēre -ere -īre remain productive; the fourth (-īre) though is generally only marginally productive.

The gradual tendency in all of the daughter languages was to proceed through the stages just described, creating a single conjugational system that applied to all tenses and aspects and allowing all verbs, including secondary verbs, to be conjugated in all inflectional categories.  Generally, the primary verbs were largely all lumped together into a single conjugation (e.g. the Latin -ere conjugation), while different secondary-verb formations produced all other conjugations; for the most part, only these latter conjugations were productive in the daughter languages.  In most languages, the original distinction between primary and secondary verbs was obscured to some extent, with some primary verbs scattered among the nominally secondary/productive conjugations.  Germanic is perhaps the family with the clearest primary/secondary distinction: Nearly all "strong verbs" are primary in origin while nearly all "weak verbs" are secondary, with the two classes clearly distinguished in their past-tense and past-participle formations.

In Greek, the difference between the present, aorist, and perfect, when used outside of the indicative (i.e. in the subjunctive, optative, imperative, infinitive, and participles) is almost entirely one of grammatical aspect, not of tense.  That is, the aorist refers to a simple action, the present to an ongoing action, and the perfect to a state resulting from a previous action.  An aorist infinitive or imperative, for example, does not refer to a past action, and in fact for many verbs (e.g. "kill") would likely be more common than a present infinitive or imperative. (In some participial constructions, however, an aorist participle can have either a tensal or aspectual meaning.)  It is assumed that this distinction of aspect was the original significance of the PIE tenses, rather than any actual tense distinction, and that tense distinctions were originally indicated by means of adverbs, as in Chinese.  It appears that by late PIE, the different tenses had already acquired a tensal meaning in particular contexts, as in Greek.  In later Indo-European languages, this became dominant.

The meanings of the three tenses in the oldest Vedic Sanskrit differs somewhat from their meanings in Greek, and thus it is not clear whether the PIE meanings corresponded exactly to the Greek meanings.  In particular, the Vedic imperfect had a meaning that was close to the Greek aorist, and the Vedic aorist had a meaning that was close to the Greek perfect.  Meanwhile, the Vedic perfect was often indistinguishable from a present tense (Whitney 1889).  In moods other than the indicative, the present, aorist, and perfect were almost indistinguishable from each other.

The lack of semantic distinction between different grammatical forms in a literary language often indicates that some of these forms no longer existed in the spoken language of the time.  In fact, in Classical Sanskrit, the subjunctive dropped out, as did all tenses of the optative and imperative other than the present; meanwhile, in the indicative the imperfect, aorist and perfect became largely interchangeable, and in later Classical Sanskrit, all three could be freely replaced by a participial construction.  All of these developments appear to reflect changes in spoken Middle Indo-Aryan; among the past tenses, for example, only the aorist survived into early Middle Indo-Aryan, which was later displaced by a participial past tense.

Developments of the various verb classes
NOTE: A blank space means the reflex of the given class in the given language is undetermined.

Germanic

In Germanic, all eventive verbs acquired primary indicative endings, regardless of the original aspectual distinction. These became the "present tense" of Germanic. Almost all presents were converted to the thematic inflection, using the singular (e-grade) stem as the basis. A few "tudati"-type thematic verbs survived (*wiganą "to battle", *knudaną "to knead"), but these were usually regularised by the daughter languages. Of the athematic verbs, only three verbs are reconstructable: 
 *wesaną "to be" (present *immi, *isti, from imperfective *h₁ésmi, *h₁ésti), 
 *beuną "to be, to become" (present *biumi, *biuþi, from perfective **bʰewHm, **bʰewHt)
 *dōną "to do, to put" (present *dōmi, *dōþi, from perfective *dʰéh₁m̥, *dʰéh₁t).

The merger of perfective and imperfective verbs brought root verbs in competition with characterised verbs, and the latter were generally lost. Consequently, Germanic has no trace of the s-suffix perfectives, and very few characterised primary imperfectives; by far the most primary verbs were simple root verbs. Some imperfectives with the ye-suffix survived into Proto-Germanic, as did one nasal-infix verb (*standaną "to stand" ~ *stōþ), but these were irregular relics. Other characterised presents were preserved only as relic formations and generally got converted to other verbal formations. For example, the present *pr̥skéti "to ask, to question" was preserved as Germanic *furskōną, which was no longer a simple thematic verb, but had been extended with the class 2 weak suffix -ō-.

Stative verbs became the "past tense" or "preterite tense" in Germanic, and new statives were generally formed to accompany the primary eventives, forming a single paradigm. A dozen or so primary statives survived, in the form of the "preterite-present verbs". These retained their stative (in Germanic, past or preterite) inflection, but did not have a past-tense meaning. The past tense ("imperfect") of the eventive verbs was entirely lost, having become redundant in function to the old statives. Only one single eventive past survives, namely of *dōną: *dedǭ, *dedē, from the past reduplicated imperfective *dʰédʰeh₁m̥, *dʰédʰeh₁t.

Secondary eventives (causatives, denominatives etc.) did not have any corresponding stative in PIE and did not acquire one in Germanic. Instead, an entirely novel formation, the so-called "dental past", was formed to them (e.g. *satjaną "to set" ~ *satidē). Thus, a clear distinction arose between "strong verbs" or primary verbs, which had a past tense originating from the statives, and "weak verbs" or secondary verbs, whose past tense used the new dental suffix. The original primary statives (preterite-presents) also used the dental suffix, and a few primary ye-suffix presents also came to use the weak past rather than the strong past, such as *wurkijaną "to work" ~ *wurhtē and *þunkijaną "to think, to consider" ~ *þunhtē. However, these verbs, having no secondary derivational suffix, attached the dental suffix directly to the root with no intervening vowel, causing irregular changes through the Germanic spirant law. Ending-wise, the strong and weak pasts converged on each other; the weak past used descendants of the secondary eventive endings, while the strong past preserved the stative endings only in the singular, and used secondary eventive endings in the dual and plural.

Balto-Slavic

The stative aspect was reduced to relics already in the Balto-Slavic, with very little of it reconstructable. The aorist and indicative past tense merged, creating the Slavic aorist. Baltic lost the aorist, while it survived in Proto-Slavic.

Modern Slavic languages have since mostly lost the aorist, but it survives in Bulgarian, Macedonian, Serbo-Croatian and Sorbian. Slavic innovated a new imperfect tense, which appeared in Old Church Slavonic and still exists in the same languages as the aorist. A new past tense was also created in the modern languages to replace or complement the aorist and imperfect, using a periphrastic combination of the copula and the so-called "l-participle", originally a deverbal adjective. In many languages today, the copula was dropped in this formation, turning the participle itself into the past tense.

The Slavic languages innovated an entirely new aspectual distinction between imperfective and perfective verbs, based on derivational formations.

See also 
 Sanskrit verbs
 Ancient Greek verbs
 Indo-European copula
 Lexikon der indogermanischen Verben (Lexicon of the Indo-European Verbs)

Notes

References

Bibliography

 

Verb
Linguistic morphology
Indo-European verbs